Royal National Life Boat Lord Southborough (Civil Service No. 1) (ON 688), was a Watson Class motor lifeboat of the Royal National Lifeboat Institution's (RNLI) fleet, which was stationed at Margate in the English county of Kent in the United Kingdom from 1925 to 1951. From 1951 she served in the RNLI Relief Fleet.

Description and origin
Lord Southborough was built in 1924 in the boatyards of Saunders-Roe, in Cowes on the Isle of Wight.

The lifeboat Lord Southborough was financed by the organization and charity known as the Civil Service, Post Office and British Telecom Lifeboat Fund or CISPOTEL, which funded many lifeboats. It was named after the Chairman and Honorary Treasurer Francis Hopwood, Lord Southborough, who was Honorary Treasurer of CISPOTEL for 33 years.

Service history
Early on the morning of 29 December 1929, Lord Southborough attempted to assist a German boat, the Hermine, which had run aground in a storm. Lord Southborough's crew were unable to re-float the Hermine, so the German crew were evacuated to shore. The government of Germany awarded certificates of thanks to Lord Southborough's crew for their efforts.

Dunkirk evacuation

On 30 May 1940, the Lord Southborough was launched to assist in the evacuation of the British Expeditionary Force at Dunkirk in France. The crew of the Lord Southborough was one of only three RNLI lifeboat crews used in the evacuation that were allowed to take their own lifeboat across the English Channel, the others being crewed by Royal Navy personnel.

Lord Southborough was the second of these lifeboats to arrive at the Dunkirk beaches, behind the Ramsgate lifeboat Prudential. The two lifeboats ferried soldiers from the beach to larger ships waiting off-shore in deeper water to evacuate them back to England.

Lord Southborough is officially credited with having evacuated 600 military personnel from Dunkirk's beach. 500 of these were ferried from the beach at La Panne to the Royal Navy destroyer . The Commanding Officer of the destroyer, Lieutenant Commander E. G. Roper, said of Lord Southborough’s crew:

The lifeboat's Coxswain Edward Parker was one of the two lifeboat coxswains in the operation awarded the Distinguished Service Medal.

The Battle of Britain
From August 1940 the Battle of Britain raged in the skies above the south coast of England, and the R.N.L.I.'s lifeboats were used to rescue airmen that had come down in the English Channel and the North Sea. One of the busiest lifeboat crews during the battle was that of Lord Southborough. On 3 September 1940 Lord Southborough was sent out to search for a missing Spitfire pilot who had been shot down in an air-to-air engagement with a Luftwaffe Messerschmitt 109. The fighter-pilot was Richard Hillary (a descendant of Sir William Hillary, the founder of the R.N.L.I. in 1824) who had sustained extensive burns to his face and hands. He was rescued and taken ashore in considerable pain. The lifeboat crew later visited him in hospital during his recovery.

HMS Guardsman
In the afternoon of 15 November 1940, the Lord Southborough launched to assist the Royal Navy Tug HMS Guardsman after she struck a mine off North Foreland headland and exploded. The Guardsman had sunk by the time Lord Southborough arrived, but the lifeboat was able to rescue seven of the nine Royal Navy personnel from the wreckage.

April 1941
At 5:45pm in the early evening of 10 April 1941 Lord Southborough was launched to search for a crashed Royal Air Force Blenheim bomber, which had been reported as having made a forced landing on Margate Sands 3 miles off shore after returning from an attack on Borkum, during which it had been damaged by anti-aircraft defensive fire. Lord Southborough located and rescued the three man R.A.F. aircrew using a small dinghy as the lifeboat could only get to within a quarter of a mile of the aircraft's crash site.

Service career
Lord Southborough was in service for the R.N.L.I. for a total of 30 years. 25 of those years were spent at Margate where she performed 278 service launches. She was credited with saving 269 lives. For the last 5 years of her R.N.L.I. career she was placed in its Relief Fleet, with which she went on to perform another 14 service launches, and she saved a further 17 lives.

Retirement and disposal
Lord Southborough was sold out of the service by the R.N.L.I. in 1955. She was bought by the Crown Agents for further use as a lifeboat in the British Overseas Territories. She is thought to have been afterwards sent to Benghazi, Libya, her fate beyond this is unsure.

References

Watson-class lifeboats
1924 ships
Little Ships of Dunkirk